Benn Harradine (born 14 October 1982) is a retired Australian discus thrower who competed at three consecutive Olympic Games, starting in 2008.

Harradine made the final of the discus at the 2006 Commonwealth Games in Melbourne where he finished eighth. He went on to win the 2010 Commonwealth title. His 5th-place finish at the 2011 World Championships is the best ever finish by an Australian man in the event. He announced his retirement after the 2018 Commonwealth Games in Gold Coast where he finished sixth.

He has broken the Australian record three times, his personal best being 68.20 metres thrown in Townsville in May 2013.

He is an indigenous athlete from the Wotjobaluk tribe in the Wimmera district of Victoria. He cites land rights activist Vincent Lingiari as one of the people he admires. He is recognized in the Australian Olympic Committee list of Australian Indigenous Olympians.

Achievements

References

External links
 
 Benn Harradine at Athletics Australia
 Benn Harradine at Australian Athletics Historical Results
  (archive)
 
 
 
  (2006, 2010)
  (2014)
 

1982 births
Living people
Australian male discus throwers
Indigenous Australian track and field athletes
Indigenous Australian Olympians
Olympic athletes of Australia
Athletes (track and field) at the 2008 Summer Olympics
Athletes (track and field) at the 2012 Summer Olympics
Athletes (track and field) at the 2016 Summer Olympics
Commonwealth Games gold medallists for Australia
Commonwealth Games medallists in athletics
Athletes (track and field) at the 2006 Commonwealth Games
Athletes (track and field) at the 2010 Commonwealth Games
Athletes (track and field) at the 2014 Commonwealth Games
Athletes (track and field) at the 2018 Commonwealth Games
World Athletics Championships athletes for Australia
Sportspeople from Newcastle, New South Wales
Medallists at the 2010 Commonwealth Games